John Kipkurgat (born 16 March 1944) is a Kenyan former middle-distance runner who won gold in men's 800 metres at the 1974 British Commonwealth Games.

Career

Kipkurgat won silver in men's 800 metres behind fellow Kenyan Cosmas Silei at the 1973 All-Africa Games in Lagos, Nigeria. At the 1974 Commonwealth Games in Christchurch, New Zealand Kipkurgat won gold, leading the 800 m final from gun to tape; his winning time of 1:43.91 was a new African and Commonwealth record, and only two-tenths off Marcello Fiasconaro's world record of 1:43.7.

Kipkurgat attempted to break Fiasconaro's world record two months later in Pointe-à-Pierre, Trinidad and Tobago. He split 1:13.2 for 600 m, but ran completely out of energy and almost walked to the finish; his 600 m split, however, remains the fastest ever in an 800 m race and one of the fastest 600 m times in any conditions.

Kipkurgat later joined the International Track Association, a professional circuit; at the time, athletics was primarily an amateur sport where most athletes only received under-the-table money, and turning openly professional disqualified him from running in further major international meets.

References

External links

1944 births
Living people
Kenyan male middle-distance runners
Athletes (track and field) at the 1974 British Commonwealth Games
Commonwealth Games gold medallists for Kenya
Commonwealth Games medallists in athletics
African Games silver medalists for Kenya
African Games medalists in athletics (track and field)
Athletes (track and field) at the 1973 All-Africa Games
Medallists at the 1974 British Commonwealth Games